ISGC may refer to:

International Shakespeare's Globe Centre in London, England; a group of buildings and facilities, the centerpiece of which is "Shakespeare's Globe".
International Symposium on Grid Computing, also known as the International Symposium on Grids and Clouds; held annually in Taipei, Taiwan. see also: List of computer science conferences
Information Systems Group, Inc., a small U.S. IT company, which operates their corporate website at the domain name "isgc.com".
Illinois Space Grant Consortium, the component of Nasa's National Space Grant College and Fellowship Program based in the State of Illinois.
the Thermaltake ISGC Fan series; a brand of cooling fans for computers, produced by Thermaltake Technology Co., Ltd.
International Stargate Command, a location in the Stargate fictional universe.
International Steel Guitar Convention.
International Society of Gastroenterological Carcinogenesis
International Society of Guatemala Collectors; a postage stamp collecting group focussed on Guatemalan stamps.
Islamic Society of Greater Chattanooga; a mosque in Chattanooga, Tennessee.
Image Shape Ground Canvas .isgc filetype.